Yuliya Oleksandrivna Yelistratova (born 15 February 1988 in Ovruch, Zhytomyr Oblast, Ukrainian SSR, Soviet Union) is a Ukrainian professional triathlete, European U23 champion of the year 2009, Number 1 in the ITU ranking (women's standing) of the year 2009 with by far the highest “total number of races” (6), several times national champion in various categories and member of the Ukrainian national team. She competed at the 2008, 2012 and 2016 Summer Olympics.

Career 
On 27 October 2004, Yelistratova took part in her first elite race and placed 9th at the European Cup in Alanya, so at the age of 15 at her Elite debut she effortlessly achieved a top-ten position among the world elite. Since then she has continuously won medals in numerous international events. She is also decorated with the title Master of Sports (International Class).

In 2009 Yelistratova took part in four competitions of the prestigious Dextro Energy World Championship Series. In Tongyeong she placed 31st (Elite), in Kitzbühel 6th (Elite), in Yokohama 21st (Elite), and at the Grand Final in Southport (Gold Coast) 5th (U23). At the two World Cup triathlons in Mooloolaba and Tiszaújváros she placed 19th and 5th respectively (Elite), at the European Cup in Brno and the Premium Asia Cup in Beijing she won the gold medals and at the beginning of this season, on 20 June 2009, she won the European U23 Championships in Tarzo Revine.
The two last races in 2009 again underlined Sapunova’s dominating role: the U23 triathlete won the gold medal at the Elite Premium European Cup in Eilat and placed 5th at the Elite World Cup in Huatulco. Having won the gold medal in 2007 and the silver medals in 2006 and 2008, Sapunova was definitely among the prospective winners in the triathlon in Alanyabut but, like one third of the competitors, she did not finish the race, for reasons unknown.

The National Ukrainian Championships of 2009 were won by Inna Tsyganok, who like Sapunova originates from the north Ukrainian town Zhytomyr and also represents the local sports club Dinamo (Russian ). Giving precedence to, and winning at, the European Cup in Brno, Sapunova obviously decided not to take part in the National Championships of 2009.

In 2010, Sapunova placed 2nd at the U23 European Championships and 11th at the U23 World Championships and finally, after disappointing positions in some preceding competitions, again she won a gold medal at the World Cup in Tiszaújváros.

In 2021, She tests positive for EPO twice. Once at the European Cup in Dnipro in the beginning of june, and in july she tests positive again at an Out of Competition control in Tokyo just before the Olympic Games.

Yelistratova's new coach for the season 2011 is the famous triathlon expert Sergio Santos.

Personal life 
She is married to fellow triathlete Danylo Sapunov.

ITU competition 
Yelistratova ITU results include:

References

External links

 Yelistratova's Official Website
 ITU Profile Page
 Ukrainian Triathlon Federation Федерация триатлона Украины in Ukrainian

1988 births
Living people
People from Ovruch
Ukrainian female triathletes
Olympic triathletes of Ukraine
Triathletes at the 2008 Summer Olympics
Triathletes at the 2012 Summer Olympics
Triathletes at the 2016 Summer Olympics
European Games competitors for Ukraine
Triathletes at the 2015 European Games
Sportspeople from Zhytomyr Oblast